Joseph Parillon (born 4 January 1979) is a Dominican cricketer. He played in seven first-class matches for the Windward Islands in 1997/98 and 1998/99.

See also
 List of Windward Islands first-class cricketers

References

External links
 

1979 births
Living people
Dominica cricketers
Windward Islands cricketers